Sebastián Báez was the defending champion but lost in the final to Juan Pablo Varillas.

Varillas won the title after defeating Báez 6–4, 7–5 in the final.

Seeds

Draw

Finals

Top half

Bottom half

References

External links
Main draw
Qualifying draw

Challenger de Santiago II - 1
2021 Singles